Alexander Stojanov (born April 25, 1973) is a Canadian former professional ice hockey player of Macedonian descent who spent three seasons in the National Hockey League (NHL). He is best known for his trade from Vancouver to Pittsburgh in exchange for Markus Näslund, in what is recognized as one of the most lopsided trades in the history of the NHL. Selected seventh overall in the 1991 NHL Entry Draft, he is now widely regarded as a draft bust.

Playing career
Born in Windsor, Ontario, Stojanov was a first round selection of the Vancouver Canucks in the 1991 NHL Entry Draft, chosen one selection after future superstar Peter Forsberg was taken by the Philadelphia Flyers. The 6'4" Stojanov had crafted a fearsome reputation in junior hockey, and impressed scouts by pummeling the much-hyped Eric Lindros in a fight during their draft year. He also possessed a soft pair of hands and a nice scoring touch around the net, scoring 25 goals for the Hamilton Dukes, and earned comparisons to Bob Probert, considered the NHL's top enforcer at the time.

Stojanov's Duke team then relocated to Guelph and became the Storm where he had an injury-plagued 1991–92 campaign.  Stojanov's club went 4–51–11 in what amounted to an expansion team, however, the first rounder only played in 33 of 66 games that season.

In 1992–93, Stojanov was traded midway through the season to the Newmarket Royals for Ryan Vanden Bussche, Mike Prokopec and a draft choice. Stojanov collected 55 points in 35 games as the rebuilding Storm moved the then 19-year-old for youth.  He played parts of the 1992–93 season in Guelph with 16-year-old rookie, Jeff O'Neill and sophomore Todd Bertuzzi.

At the conclusion of the season, he turned pro and joined the Hamilton Canucks, Vancouver's American Hockey League affiliate, and impressed by scoring four goals in his first four games. However, a shoulder injury would require major surgical reconstruction and he missed almost the entire 1993–94 campaign as a result, and never again showed the offensive touch he had earlier in his career.

In 1994–95, Stojanov recorded 18 goals and 270 penalty minutes for the Syracuse Crunch, and earned himself a four-game callup to the NHL. He was also kept on Vancouver's roster for the NHL playoffs, and appeared in the first five playoff games of his career.

For the 1995–96 campaign, Stojanov cracked the Canucks' roster full-time as the team's enforcer, appearing in 58 games and recording a single assist. A notable event during this season was a fight with Kelly Chase of the Hartford Whalers. However, at the trade deadline, Stojanov was dealt to the Pittsburgh Penguins in exchange for Markus Näslund. He scored his first NHL goal in his Penguin debut, and finished the year with a goal and two points in 68 games between Vancouver and Pittsburgh, along with 130 penalty minutes.

In 1996–97, Stojanov spent the entire year in Pittsburgh, but appeared in only 35 games, recording one goal and four assists for five points along with 79 penalty minutes. By the 1997–98 season, he found himself back in the AHL, assigned to the Penguins' farm team in Syracuse, and would never play in the NHL again.

Released by Pittsburgh in 1998, Stojanov toiled for two more years in the International Hockey League and then for two years with the New Mexico Scorpions of the Central Hockey League before retiring in 2002. He finished his NHL career with totals of two goals and five assists for seven points in 107 NHL games, along with 222 penalty minutes.

While Stojanov was considered a major disappointment for a seventh overall pick during his time in Vancouver, he is now best known as the player dealt for Markus Näslund. Näslund would go on to captain the Canucks, and become the club's all-time leading scorer, remaining with the team more than a decade after the trade.

Career statistics

References

External links

1973 births
Canadian expatriate ice hockey players in the United States
Canadian ice hockey right wingers
Canadian people of Macedonian descent
Detroit Vipers players
Guelph Storm players
Hamilton Bulldogs (AHL) players
Hamilton Canucks players
Hamilton Dukes players
Ice hockey people from Ontario
Living people
Milwaukee Admirals (IHL) players
National Hockey League first-round draft picks
New Mexico Scorpions (CHL) players
New Mexico Scorpions (WPHL) players
Newmarket Royals players
Pittsburgh Penguins players
Sportspeople from Windsor, Ontario
Syracuse Crunch players
Vancouver Canucks draft picks
Vancouver Canucks players